Mahershala Ali (born Mahershalalhashbaz Gilmore, February 16, 1974) is an American actor. He has received multiple accolades, including two Academy Awards, a Golden Globe Award and a Primetime Emmy Award. Time magazine named him one of the 100 most influential people in the world in 2019,  and in 2020, The New York Times ranked him among the 25 greatest actors of the 21st century.

After pursuing an MFA degree from New York University, Ali began his career as a regular on television series, such as Crossing Jordan (2001–2002) and Threat Matrix (2003–2004), before his breakthrough role as Richard Tyler in the science fiction series The 4400 (2004–2007). His first major film role was in the David Fincher-directed fantasy The Curious Case of Benjamin Button (2008). He gained wider attention for supporting roles in the final two films of The Hunger Games film series, and in House of Cards, for which he received his first Primetime Emmy Award nomination.

Ali won the Academy Award for Best Supporting Actor for his performances as a drug dealer in the drama Moonlight (2016) and as Don Shirley in the comedy-drama film Green Book (2018). He is the first Muslim actor to win an Oscar, the first Black actor to win two Academy Awards in the same category, and the second Black actor to win multiple acting Oscars.

In 2019, he played a troubled police officer in the third season of the HBO anthology crime series True Detective and in 2020, he starred in the second season of the Hulu comedy-drama series Ramy. He was nominated for Primetime Emmy Awards for both performances. Ali has also played Cornell "Cottonmouth" Stokes in the first season of the Netflix series Luke Cage (2016).

Early life and education
Ali was born on February 16, 1974, in Oakland, California, the son of Willicia Goines (born 1957) and Phillip Gilmore (1956–1994). He was raised as a Christian in Hayward, California by his mother, an ordained Baptist minister whose mother, Evia Goines, was also an ordained minister at Palma Ceia Baptist Church in Hayward, CA. His father was an actor who appeared on Broadway. Maher-shalal-hash-baz is the name of the prophet Isaiah's second child (chapter 8, Book of Isaiah).

He attended St. Mary's College of California (SMC) in Moraga, California, where he graduated in 1996 with a degree in mass communication. He entered SMC with a basketball scholarship and went by the name "Hershal Gilmore" when playing for the SMC Gaels. He became disenchanted with the idea of a sports career because of the treatment given to the team's athletes and developed an interest in acting, particularly after taking part in a staging of Spunk, which later landed him an apprenticeship at the California Shakespeare Theater following graduation. After a sabbatical year working for Gavin Report, he enrolled in New York University's graduate acting program at Tisch School of the Arts, earning his master's degree in 2000.

Career

Acting

Ali was known professionally by his full name, Mahershalalhashbaz Ali, from 2001 until 2010, when he began to be credited as Mahershala Ali. Ali had considered shortening his name for a while, saying that using his full first name was "a crazy thing to do considering that we're in Hollywood", although he had never been pressured by managers or agents to change it. He decided to use a shorter version of his first name after being told that his full name was too long to fit on the poster for the film The Place Beyond the Pines. He did not want the alternative of "M. Ali" to represent himself on the poster, so he chose to adopt the shorter version of his name.

He elaborated in an interview to Vanity Fair in October 2016: 

He is known for his portrayal of Remy Danton in the Netflix series House of Cards, Cornell Stokes in Marvel's Luke Cage, Colonel Boggs in The Hunger Games: Mockingjay – Part 1 and The Hunger Games: Mockingjay – Part 2 and Tizzy in the 2008 film The Curious Case of Benjamin Button, his first major film role. Other notable films include Predators, The Place Beyond the Pines, Free State of Jones, Hidden Figures.

For his performance as mentor and drug dealer Juan in the drama film Moonlight (2016), Ali received universal acclaim from critics and won the Academy Award for Best Supporting Actor, the SAG Award and the Critics' Choice Award for Best Supporting Actor and received a Golden Globe and a BAFTA Award nomination. At the 89th Academy Awards, he was the first Muslim actor to win an Oscar.

In 2017, Ali joined the video game Madden NFL 18 story mode Longshot, in which he played Cutter Wade, the father of protagonist Devin. He played Don Shirley in the 2018 film Green Book, receiving his second Academy Award for Best Supporting Actor, Golden Globe Award for Best Supporting Actor – Motion Picture and the BAFTA Award for Best Actor in a Supporting Role.

Ali starred as Arkansas State Police detective Wayne Hays in the third season of the HBO series True Detective, which premiered on January 13, 2019, in the United States. On Rotten Tomatoes, the site's critical consensus reads, "Driven by Mahershala Ali's mesmerizing performance, True Detectives third season finds fresh perspective by exploring real world events – though it loses some of the series' intriguing strangeness along the way."

At the annual San Diego Comic-Con in July 2019, Ali was announced as being cast to play the supernatural superhero Blade in the Marvel Cinematic Universe film of the same name, which was previously played by Wesley Snipes.

Music
Ali was signed to Bay Area recording label Hieroglyphics Imperium during the late 2000s and recorded rap music as Prince Ali. In 2006, he released his first album, Corner Ensemble, followed by Curb Side Service in 2007, but did not tour to promote the album, choosing instead to focus on his acting career. In 2015 Ali appeared on rap artist Hus Kingpin album "House Of Cards" lending his voice to skits and rapping on the track entitled "House Of Card Gods" using his moniker .In 2019, he made a guest appearance on Keith Murray's album Lord Of The Metaphor 2 alongside Casual and Planet Asia, and in 2020, appeared on Riz Ahmed's album The Long Goodbye.

Personal life
Ali converted to Ahmadiyya Islam in 2000, changing his surname from Gilmore to Ali. In interviews, he has claimed being the subject of racial profiling at airports and banks following the September 11 attacks.

He is married to Amatus Sami-Karim, an actress and musician. Their first child, a daughter, was born in February 2017.

Ali is a fan of hip hop and has said within various interviews that Planet Asia, Roc Marciano, Mach-Hommy, Pink Siifu, 
Fly Anakin & Mutant Academy, Mick Jenkins, Sage Elsesser, EARTHGANG, Westside Gunn, Hus Kingpin & SmooVth are amongst his favorite artists.

Discography

Studio albums
 Corner Ensemble (2006)
 Curb Side Service (2007)

Filmography

Film

Television

Video games

Accolades

Notes

References

External links
 
 Ali college basketball stats at Sports Reference

1974 births
Living people
21st-century American male actors
African-American former Christians
African-American male actors
African-American Muslims
American Ahmadis
American male film actors
American male television actors
American male video game actors
American male voice actors
Audiobook narrators
Basketball players from California
Best Supporting Actor Academy Award winners
Best Supporting Actor BAFTA Award winners
Best Supporting Actor Golden Globe (film) winners
Converts to Islam from Christianity
Male actors from Oakland, California
Outstanding Performance by a Male Actor in a Supporting Role Screen Actors Guild Award winners
Outstanding Performance by a Cast in a Motion Picture Screen Actors Guild Award winners
Point guards
Primetime Emmy Award winners
Saint Mary's Gaels men's basketball players
Sportspeople from Hayward, California
Tisch School of the Arts alumni
People from Mount Washington, Los Angeles